Richard Molesworth Taylor (1835 – 26 August 1919), also known as Sydenham Taylor, was a three-term New Zealand Member of Parliament. Born in London in 1835, he moved to Auckland on the Heather Bell in 1846. He travelled to Victoria in 1851, and later to New South Wales and participated in the gold rush before returning to Auckland in 1857. There he briefly joined the militia, serving in the New Zealand Wars, before becoming a government contractor. In 1869 he moved to Canterbury, working as a general contractor until becoming a Member of Parliament in 1886.

Member of Parliament

William White resigned his Sydenham seat in Parliament in March 1886 on medical advice. Taylor successfully contested the subsequent by-election on 12 May, gaining 438 votes against John Lee Scott (418), Samuel Paull Andrews (230) and S. G. Jolly (2).

At the 1887 general election, Taylor contested the electorate against John Crewes. They received 766 and 392 votes respectively, so Taylor entered the 10th New Zealand Parliament.

The Sydenham electorate was abolished in 1890 so Taylor contested the City of Christchurch electorate instead, winning the third highest number of votes in the three-member electorate. He unsuccessfully contested the 1893 and 1896 general elections, and the 1896 by-election.

Private life
Taylor was married in 1887 to Laura Augusta Gray (born ca. 1832), a daughter of S. F. Gray of London. She died on 21 December 1903 at their home in Waltham Road, Sydenham, aged 69.

Taylor died in Wellington on 26 August 1919, and was buried at Karori Cemetery.

References

|-

1835 births
1919 deaths
Members of the New Zealand House of Representatives
People of the New Zealand Wars
New Zealand MPs for Christchurch electorates
English emigrants to New Zealand
Independent MPs of New Zealand
Unsuccessful candidates in the 1893 New Zealand general election
Unsuccessful candidates in the 1896 New Zealand general election
Burials at Karori Cemetery
19th-century New Zealand politicians